Finchley's municipal elections were held on 10 May 1963. One third of the seats represented by councillors were up for election. One seat falling vacant in each of the eight wards.

Background
Finchley Council was made up of 32 elected members; 24 Councillors who were elected by the voting public and 8 Aldermen who were elected by the Councillors. Councillors served a three year term while Aldermen served a six year term. Since the council was enlarged in 1950 the Conservative Party had been in power. After the 1962 elections the Liberals had the most Councillors but the Conservatives retained power as they had more Aldermen.

Election result

The result had the following consequences for the total number of seats on the council after the elections:

The Conservatives lost their majority and went into opposition. The Liberal won a majority taking control of the council for the first time.

Ward result

References

Finchley